Coscineuta is a genus of short-horned grasshoppers in the family Acrididae. There are about eight described species in Coscineuta, found in the Neotropics and South America.

Species
These species belong to the genus Coscineuta:
 Coscineuta cicatricosa Bolívar, 1890
 Coscineuta coxalis (Serville, 1838)
 Coscineuta haematonota (Burmeister, 1838)
 Coscineuta marginalis (Walker, 1870)
 Coscineuta matensis Rehn, 1918
 Coscineuta pulchripes (Gerstaecker, 1889)
 Coscineuta trochilus (Gerstaecker, 1873)
 Coscineuta virens (Thunberg, 1815) (Moruga Grasshopper)

References

External links

 

Acrididae